George Woodcock (May 8, 1912 – January 28, 1995) was a Canadian writer of political biography and history, an anarchist thinker, a philosopher, an essayist and literary critic. He was also a poet and published several volumes of travel writing. In 1959 he was the founding editor of the journal Canadian Literature which was the first academic journal specifically dedicated to Canadian writing. He is most commonly known outside Canada for his book Anarchism: A History of Libertarian Ideas and Movements (1962).

Life
Woodcock was born in Winnipeg, Manitoba, but moved with his parents to England at an early age, attending Sir William Borlase's Grammar School in Marlow and Morley College. Though his family was quite poor, Woodcock's grandfather offered to pay his tuition if he went to Cambridge University which he turned down due to the condition that he undertake seminary training for the Anglican clergy. Instead, he took a job as a clerk at the Great Western Railway and it was there that he first became interested in anarchism. He was to remain an anarchist for the rest of his life, writing several books on the subject, including Anarchism, the anthology The Anarchist Reader (1977), and biographies of Pierre-Joseph Proudhon, William Godwin, Oscar Wilde and Peter Kropotkin. It was during these years that he met several prominent literary figures, including T. S. Eliot and Aldous Huxley, and forging a particularly close relationship with the art theorist Herbert Read. Woodcock's first published work was The White Island, a collection of poetry, which was issued by Fortune Press in 1940.

Woodcock spent World War II working as a conscientious objector on a farm in Essex, and in 1949, moved to British Columbia.

At Camp Angel in Oregon, a camp for conscientious objectors, he was a founder of the Untide Press, which sought to bring poetry to the public in an inexpensive but attractive format. Following the war, he returned to Canada, eventually settling in Vancouver, British Columbia. In 1955, he took a post in the English department of the University of British Columbia, where he stayed until the 1970s. Around this time he started to write more prolifically, producing several travel books and collections of poetry, as well as the works on anarchism for which he is best known in collaboration with Ivan Avakumović.

Towards the end of his life, Woodcock became increasingly interested in what he saw as the plight of Tibetans. He traveled to India, studied Buddhism, became friends with the Dalai Lama and established the Tibetan Refugee Aid Society. With Inge, his wife, Woodcock established Canada India Village Aid, which sponsors self-help projects in rural India. Both organizations exemplify Woodcock's ideal of voluntary cooperation between peoples across national boundaries.

George and Inge also established a program to support professional Canadian writers. The Woodcock Fund, which began in 1989, provides financial assistance to writers in mid-book-project who face an unforeseen financial need that threatens the completion of their book. The Fund is available to writers of fiction, creative non-fiction, plays, and poetry. The Woodcocks helped create an endowment for the program in excess of two million dollars. The Woodcock Fund program is administered by the Writers' Trust of Canada and by March 2012 had distributed $887,273 to 180 Canadian writers.

George Woodcock died at his home in Vancouver, British Columbia, Canada, on January 28, 1995.

Orwell
Woodcock first came to know George Orwell after they had a public disagreement in the pages of the Partisan Review. In his "London Letter" published in the March–April 1942 issue of the review, Orwell had written that in the context of a war against fascism, pacifism was "objectively pro-fascist". As the founder and editor of Now, an "anti-war paper" which Orwell had mentioned in his article as an example of publications that published contributions by both pacifists and fascists, Woodcock took exception to this. Woodcock stated that "the review had abandoned its position as an independent forum", and was now "the cultural review of the British Anarchist movement". Despite this difference, the two became good friends and kept up a correspondence until Orwell's death, and Now would publish Orwell's article "How the Poor Die" in its November 6, 1946 issue.

Woodcock and Orwell would both also be active members of the Freedom Defence Committee.

Woodcock later wrote The Crystal Spirit (1966), a critical study of Orwell and his work which won a Governor General's Award. The title is taken from the last line of the poem written by Orwell in memory of the Italian militiaman he met in Barcelona in December 1936 during the Spanish Civil War, a meeting Orwell describes in the opening lines to Homage to Catalonia (1938).

Recognition
Woodcock was honoured with several awards, including a Fellowship of the Royal Society of Canada in 1968, the UBC Medal for Popular Biography in 1973 and 1976, and the Molson Prize in 1973. In 1970, he received an honorary doctorate from Sir George Williams University, which later became Concordia University. However, he only accepted awards given by his peers, refusing several awards given by the Canadian state, including the Order of Canada. The one exception was the award of the Freedom of the City of Vancouver, which he accepted in 1994.

He is the subject of a biography, The Gentle Anarchist: A Life of George Woodcock (1998) by George Fetherling, and a documentary George Woodcock: Anarchist of Cherry Street by Tom Shandel and Alan Twigg.

Selected bibliography
 Anarchy or Chaos – 1944
 William Godwin: A biographical study – 1946
 The Incomparable Aphra – 1948
 The Anarchist Prince: A Biographical Study of Peter Kropotkin – 1950 (with  Ivan Avakumović)
 Ravens and Prophets – 1952
 Pierre-Joseph Proudhon – 1956
 To the City of the Dead: An Account of Travels in Mexico – 1957
 Incas and Other Men: Travels in the Andes - 1959
 Anarchism: A History of Libertarian Ideas and Movements – 1962
 Faces of India: A Travel Narrative – 1964
 Asia, Gods and Cities: Aden to Tokyo - 1966
 The Crystal Spirit: A Study of George Orwell – 1966
 The Greeks in India – 1966
 Kerala: A Portrait of the Malabar Coast - 1967
 The Doukhobors – 1968 (with  Ivan Avakumovic)
 Henry Walter Bates: Naturalist of the Amazons - 1969
 The British in the Far East – 1969
 The British in the Middle East – 1970
 The Hudson's Bay Company – 1970
 Canada and the Canadians - 1970
 Into Tibet: The Early British Explorers – 1971
 Victoria – 1971
 Gandhi – Fontana Modern Masters, 1972
 Dawn and the Darkest Hour: A Study of Aldous Huxley – 1972
 The Rejection of Politics and Other Essays on Canada, Canadians, Anarchism and the World – 1972
 Herbert Read: The Stream and the Source - 1973
 Who Killed the British Empire?: An Inquest – 1974
 Amor de Cosmos: Journalist and Reformer – 1975
 Gabriel Dumont: The Métis Chief and his Lost World – 1975
 South Sea Journey – 1976
 Peoples of the Coast: The Indians of the Pacific Northwest  – 1977
 The Anarchist Reader – 1977 (editor)
 Anima, or, Swann Grown Old: A Cycle of Poems – 1977
 Two Plays – 1977
 Thomas Merton Monk And Poet – A Critical Study – 1978
 The World of Canadian Writing: Critiques and Recollections – 1980
 100 Great Canadians – 1980
 Confederation Betrayed! – 1981
 The Meeting of Time and Space: Regionalism in Canadian Literature – 1981
 Taking it to the Letter – 1981
 Letter to the Past: An Autobiography – 1982
 Orwell's Message: 1984 & the Present – 1984
 Strange Bedfellows: The State and the Arts in Canada – 1985
 The University of British Columbia: A Souvenir – 1986 (with Tim Fitzharris)
 Northern Spring: The Flowering of Canadian Literature in English – 1987
 Caves in the Desert: Travels in China – 1988
 The Purdy-Woodcock Letters: Selected Correspondence, 1964–1984 – 1988
 William Godwin: A Biographical Study – 1989
 A Social History of Canada – 1989
 Powers of Observation – 1989
 Oscar Wilde: The Double Image - 1989 
 The Century that Made Us: Canada 1814–1914 – 1989
 British Columbia: A History of the Province – 1990
 Tolstoy at Yasnaya Polyana & Other Poems – 1991
 Anarchism and Anarchists: Essays – 1992
 The Cherry Tree on Cherry Street: And Other Poems – 1994
 Marvellous Century: Archaic Man and the Awakening of Reason'' – 2005

See also
 Anarchism in Canada

References

Further reading 
 Antliff, Mark. "Pacifism, Violence and Aesthetics: George Woodcock's Anarchist Sojourn, 1940–1950 1." Anarchist Studies 23.1 (2015): 15–44.
 Antliff, Allan, and Matthew S. Adams. "George Woodcock's transatlantic anarchism." Anarchist Studies 23.1 (2015): 6–14.
 
 Evren, Süreyyya, and Ruth Kinna. "George Woodcock: The Ghost Writer of Anarchism 1." Anarchist Studies 23.1 (2015): 45–61.
 Adams, Matthew S. "Memory, History, and Homesteading: George Woodcock, Herbert Read, and Intellectual Networks 1." Anarchist Studies 23.1 (2015): 86–104.

External links

 Full texts at the Internet Archive
 George Woodcock Official Site (2013 Archive.org Backup)
 George Woodcock fonds at Queen's University Archives.
 Tibetan Refugee Aid Society founded in 1962 by George and Inge Woodcock to aid Tibetan refugees fleeing the Chinese occupation.
 Canada India Village Aid George Woodcock co-founder and past director.
 George Woodcock Biography at Anarchist Encyclopedia.
 .
 George Woodcock, Reflections on Decentralism (1969)

1912 births
1995 deaths
20th-century biographers
20th-century Canadian essayists
20th-century Canadian male writers
20th-century Canadian philosophers
20th-century Canadian poets
20th-century essayists
20th-century memoirists
20th-century poets
Anarcho-pacifists
British conscientious objectors
Canadian anarchists
Canadian anti-war activists
Canadian autobiographers
Canadian biographers
20th-century Canadian historians
Canadian libertarians
Canadian literary critics
Canadian male dramatists and playwrights
Canadian male essayists
Canadian male non-fiction writers
Canadian male poets
Canadian memoirists
Canadian pacifists
Canadian travel writers
Governor General's Award-winning non-fiction writers
Historians of anarchism
Libertarian socialists
Literary theorists
Male biographers
People educated at Sir William Borlase's Grammar School
Political philosophers
Canadian social commentators
Social philosophers
Theorists on Western civilization
Academic staff of the University of British Columbia
Writers from Vancouver
Writers from Winnipeg
Anarchist writers